Svenska Serien 1914–15, part of the 1914–15 Swedish football season, was the fifth Svenska Serien season played. IFK Göteborg won the league ahead of runners-up AIK.

League table

References 

Print

Online

1914-15
Sweden
1